Anatoly Trofimovich Polyanski (29 January 1928, in Avdiivka, Soviet Union (now Ukraine) – 7 June 1993, in Moscow, Russia) was a Russian architect.

Work
His work includes the pavilion of the USSR on the International World Fair in Brussels (Grand Prix) in 1958 pioneer camp, Artek in Crimea, the Museum of the Great Patriotic War, Moscow, the Yalta Hotel Complex and the USSR embassy buildings in Greece, Sweden and Egypt.

External links

  l’Architecture d’aujourd’hui № 147. Paris, 1968.
 New world review, Vol. 33, page 49 // N.W.R. Publications, 1965

Full Members of the USSR Academy of Arts
Full Members of the Russian Academy of Arts
1928 births
1993 deaths
20th-century Russian architects